This is a list of cases reported in volume 144 of United States Reports, decided by the Supreme Court of the United States in 1892.

Justices of the Supreme Court at the time of volume 144 U.S. 

The Supreme Court is established by Article III, Section 1 of the Constitution of the United States, which says: "The judicial Power of the United States, shall be vested in one supreme Court . . .". The size of the Court is not specified; the Constitution leaves it to Congress to set the number of justices. Under the Judiciary Act of 1789 Congress originally fixed the number of justices at six (one chief justice and five associate justices). Since 1789 Congress has varied the size of the Court from six to seven, nine, ten, and back to nine justices (always including one chief justice).

When the cases in volume 144 U.S. were decided the Court comprised the following eight members (Justice Joseph P. Bradley had died in January 1892):

Notable Cases in 144 U.S.

United States v. Ballin
United States v. Ballin,   144 U.S. 1 (1892), is a Supreme Court decision discussing the constitutional definition of "a quorum to do business" in Congress. The Court, analyzing the constitutional limitations on the United States Senate and House of Representatives when determining their rules of proceedings, held that it fell within the powers of the House and Senate to establish their own rules for verifying whether a majority of their members is present, as required for a quorum under Article I of the Constitution.

Lau Ow Bew v. United States
Lau Ow Bew v. United States,   144 U.S. 47 (1892), is a case occurring at the beginning of the era of Chinese Exclusion as well as the formation of the United States courts of appeals. The case set precedents for the interpretation of the rights of Chinese merchants and the jurisdiction of the new courts. The Supreme Court's ruling relied heavily the Burlingame Treaty of 1868, the Angell Treaty of 1880, the Chinese Exclusion Act of 1882 and the amendments to the Act in 1884, as well as the Evarts Act of 1891.  The case helped to establish not only the rights of the Chinese merchant class, but also informed future cases about the power of the Circuit Courts of Appeal as well as the perception of Chinese immigrants.

Citation style 

Under the Judiciary Act of 1789 the federal court structure at the time comprised District Courts, which had general trial jurisdiction; Circuit Courts, which had mixed trial and appellate (from the US District Courts) jurisdiction; and the United States Supreme Court, which had appellate jurisdiction over the federal District and Circuit courts—and for certain issues over state courts. The Supreme Court also had limited original jurisdiction (i.e., in which cases could be filed directly with the Supreme Court without first having been heard by a lower federal or state court). There were one or more federal District Courts and/or Circuit Courts in each state, territory, or other geographical region.

The Judiciary Act of 1891 created the United States Courts of Appeals and reassigned the jurisdiction of most routine appeals from the district and circuit courts to these appellate courts. The Act created nine new courts that were originally known as the "United States Circuit Courts of Appeals." The new courts had jurisdiction over most appeals of lower court decisions. The Supreme Court could review either legal issues that a court of appeals certified or decisions of court of appeals by writ of certiorari.

Bluebook citation style is used for case names, citations, and jurisdictions.  
 "# Cir." = United States Court of Appeals
 e.g., "3d Cir." = United States Court of Appeals for the Third Circuit
 e.g.,"C.C.D.N.J." = United States Circuit Court for the District of New Jersey
 e.g.,"D. Mass." = United States District Court for the District of Massachusetts 
 "E." = Eastern; "M." = Middle; "N." = Northern; "S." = Southern; "W." = Western
 e.g.,"C.C.S.D.N.Y." = United States Circuit Court for the Southern District of New York
 e.g.,"M.D. Ala." = United States District Court for the Middle District of Alabama
 "Ct. Cl." = United States Court of Claims
 The abbreviation of a state's name alone indicates the highest appellate court in that state's judiciary at the time. 
 e.g.,"Pa." = Supreme Court of Pennsylvania
 e.g.,"Me." = Supreme Judicial Court of Maine

List of cases in volume 144 U.S.

Notes and references

External links
  Case reports in volume 144 from Library of Congress
  Case reports in volume 144 from Court Listener
  Case reports in volume 144 from the Caselaw Access Project of Harvard Law School
  Case reports in volume 144 from Google Scholar
  Case reports in volume 144 from Justia
  Case reports in volume 144 from Open Jurist
 Website of the United States Supreme Court
 United States Courts website about the Supreme Court
 National Archives, Records of the Supreme Court of the United States
 American Bar Association, How Does the Supreme Court Work?
 The Supreme Court Historical Society

1892 in United States case law